Paractora is a genus of flies in the family Helcomyzidae.

Species
P. angustata Malloch, 1933
P. antarctica (Thomson, 1869)
P. asymmetrica (Enderlein, 1930)
P. bipunctata (Hutton, 1901)
P. dreuxi Séguy, 1965
P. jeanneli Séguy, 1940
P. moseleyi (Austen, 1913)
P. rufipes (Macquart, 1844)
P. trichosterna (Thomson, 1869)

References

Helcomyzidae
Sciomyzoidea genera
Taxa named by Jacques-Marie-Frangile Bigot